Noholme (also known as Noholme II) (1956–1983) was an Australian Thoroughbred racehorse who was the 1959 Australian Horse of the Year  and who took nearly a full second off the race record in winning the prestigious Cox Plate.

He was sired by Star Kingdom (IRE), the Leading sire in Australia on five occasions and sire of Sky High etc. Noholme's dam, Oceana, was a daughter of the brilliant miler Colombo (won 2,000 Guineas Stakes) from the good mare Orama by Diophon (also won the 2,000 Guineas). Noholme was a full brother to the stallions, Todman, Faringdon and Shifnal. These four stallions sired progeny that had earned over $12 million in stakes-money to the end of 1979.

Racing record
The small, 15 hands 2 inches, chestnut colt was trained by Maurice McCarten in Sydney, Australia.

At two years he was unplaced in the Golden Slipper Stakes, but followed with a win in the Champagne Stakes and was ranked sixth on the Two-year old Free Handicap.

As a three-year-old Noholme defeated older horses in the Epsom Handicap. In winning the weight-for-age W. S. Cox Plate over ten furlongs (approximately 2,000 metres) he set a course-record time of 2:02. During 1959 he also won the STC Hill Stakes, VRC CB Fisher Plate and VRC Linlithgow Stakes before he won the 1960 AJC All Aged Stakes Noholme was voted. Australian Horse of the Year in 1959.

In July 1960 he was purchased by an American horseman Gene Goff who exported him to the United States where he was trained by Arthur W. Beuzeville and raced as Noholme II until being retired to stud. Noholme was part of a shipload of forty-one Thoroughbreds bought by Goff in Australia where he spent considerable time as a result of his investment in oil exploration in the Maryborough Basin of coastal Queensland. Noholme II had several race starts in the US but did not win, although he placed in the Orange Bowl, Chicago, Stars and Stripes, and Bougainvillea Turf Handicaps.

Stud record
A successful stallion at Goff's Verna Lea Farm in Fayetteville, Arkansas, in 1967 he was syndicated for $1-million and moved to Robin's Nest Farm near Ocala, Florida then in 1974 to the nearby stud farm owned by Dan Lasater (now Southland Farm) where he died on 17 May 1983 at the age of 27. Noholme was the first horse to be buried in the Lasater Farm equine cemetery.

In his limited first season, he sired 13 live foals, 11 of which were race winners. Noholme sired 24 two-year-old winners in his next crop, putting him on top of the American list of first crop sires. In that first crop was champion handicap horse Nodouble, an outstanding runner who was voted American Co-Champion Older Male Horse honours in 1969 and 1970 and was the Leading sire in North America in 1981. Nodouble sired over 450 stakes winners that earned over $11.6 million during his career.

Noholme's has sired 279 winners of 1,432 races and his other offspring include:
 Brigand, sire of Cole Diesel (won Caulfield Cup)
 Carnauba, Premio Oaks d'Italia (Italian Oaks), champion Italian filly 
 Fools Holme, the 1986 South African Horse of the Year, 
 General Holme, European stakes-winner, significant sire in France.
 Shecky Greene, the 1973 American Champion Sprint Horse and in a short career, he in turn sired Green Forest, the champion two-year-old of Europe in 1981, and a successful sire.

References

External links
 Noholme II

Cox Plate winners
1956 racehorse births
Racehorses bred in Australia
Racehorses trained in Australia
Racehorses trained in the United States
Thoroughbred family 1-u
Chefs-de-Race